BR-090 is the designation for a potential federal highway of Brazil. If built the road would connect Brasilia to the extreme north of the country.

References

Federal highways in Brazil